Brita in the Merchant's House (Swedish: Brita i grosshandlarhuset) is a 1946 Swedish drama film directed by Åke Ohberg and starring George Fant, Eva Dahlbeck and Åke Grönberg. It was shot at the Sundbyberg Studios in Stockholm. The film's sets were designed by the art director Max Linder.

Synopsis
Brita leaves her dull, impoverished rural existence and moves to Stockholm where she gets a job as a maid in the house of a wealthy wholesaler where she falls in love with the merchant's son. However, Arvid, a young man from her home village comes to the city to court her as well.

Cast
 George Fant as 	Greger
 Eva Dahlbeck as 	Brita
 Åke Grönberg as 	Arvid
 Ernst Eklund as 	Grosshandlaren
 Stina Hedberg as Hans fru
 Hilda Borgström as 	Ida
 Olav Riégo as 	Kanslirådet
 Renée Björling as 	Hans fru
 Agneta Lagerfeldt as 	Sonja 
 Ib Schønberg as 	Korvgubben
 Bengt Ekerot as 	'Paniken' 
 Carl Ström as 	Britas far
 Linnéa Hillberg as 	Britas mor
 Anna-Greta Krigström as 	Ella 
 Astrid Bodin as 	Kokerskan
 Carin Swensson as 	Extrahjälpen
 Olle Hilding as 	Olsson
 John Norrman as 	Postman 
 Aurore Palmgren as 	Arvid's Mother 
 Nils Hallberg as 	Conscript 
 Ingemar Holde as 	Conscript
 Tord Stål as Officer
 Albert Ståhl as 	Janitor

References

Bibliography 
 Qvist, Per Olov & von Bagh, Peter. Guide to the Cinema of Sweden and Finland. Greenwood Publishing Group, 2000.

External links 
 

1946 films
Swedish drama films
1946 drama films
1940s Swedish-language films
Films directed by Åke Ohberg
Films based on Swedish novels
Films set in Stockholm
1940s Swedish films